The Well is the eighth studio album by Jennifer Warnes. It was released in 2001, Warnes' first album in nine years. It includes her own compositions and covers renowned songwriters Arlo Guthrie, Billy Joel, Allen Toussaint and Tom Waits. Guthrie lends guest vocals to his "Patriot's Dream" while Doyle Bramhall I duets with Warnes on the classic Eddy Arnold song "You Don't Know Me". The album has been reissued over the years, first in 2003 in the Super Audio CD format, and then in 2009 with additional bonus tracks. The album saw its debut European release in 2016, when it was released by BMG records on March 4.

Track listing
"The Well" (Jennifer Warnes, Doyle Bramhall II) – 4:47
"It's Raining" (Allen Toussaint) – 3:26
"Prairie Melancholy" (Warnes, Nancy Bacal) – 5:44
"Too Late Love Comes" (Warnes) – 4:21
"Invitation to the Blues" (Tom Waits) – 5:12
"And So It Goes" (Billy Joel) – 4:37
"The Panther" (Warnes, Bramhall) – 4:23
"You Don't Know Me" (Eddy Arnold, Cindy Walker) – 2:59
"The Nightingale" (Jude Johnstone) – 5:32
"Patriot's Dream" (Arlo Guthrie) – 5:15
"The Well (reprise)" (Warnes, Bramhall) – 1:54

2003 SACD Bonus track

12. "Loco Girl" - 5:10

2009 reissue track listing
"The Well" (Jennifer Warnes, Doyle Bramhall II) – 4:47
"It's Raining" (Allen Toussaint) – 3:26
"Prairie Melancholy" (Warnes, Nancy Bacal) – 5:44
"Too Late Love Comes" (Warnes) – 4:21
"La Luna Brilla" - 4:47
"Fool for the Look (In Your Eye) - 3:23
"Invitation to the Blues" (Tom Waits) – 5:12
"And So It Goes" (Billy Joel) – 4:37
"The Panther" (Warnes, Bramhall) – 4:23
"You Don't Know Me" (Eddy Arnold, Cindy Walker) – 2:59
"The Nightingale" (Jude Johnstone) – 5:32
"Patriot's Dream" (Arlo Guthrie) – 5:15
"The Well (reprise)" (Warnes, Bramhall) – 1:54
"Show Me the Light" (duet with Bill Medley) (bonus track on CD edition) - 4:34
"Born in Time" (bonus track exclusive to the LP edition)

2016 UK edition
"The Well" (Jennifer Warnes, Doyle Bramhall II) – 4:47
"It's Raining" (Allen Toussaint) – 3:26
"Prairie Melancholy" (Warnes, Nancy Bacal) – 5:44
"Too Late Love Comes" (Warnes) – 4:21
"La Luna Brilla" - 4:47
"Fool for the Look (In Your Eye) - 3:23
"Invitation to the Blues" (Tom Waits) – 5:12
"And So It Goes" (Billy Joel) – 4:37
"The Panther" (Warnes, Bramhall) – 4:23
"You Don't Know Me" (Eddy Arnold, Cindy Walker) – 2:59
"The Nightingale" (Jude Johnstone) – 5:32
"Patriot's Dream" (Arlo Guthrie) – 5:15
"The Well (reprise)" (Warnes, Bramhall) – 1:54

Personnel
Jennifer Warnes - vocals, background vocals
Martin Davich – piano, synthesizer, harmonium, keyboards, background vocals
Doyle Bramhall II – guitar, vocals, drums
Dean Parks – guitar, mandolin
Vinnie Colaiuta – drums
George Doering – guitar, mandolin
Abraham Laboriel – bass
Rick Cunha – guitar
Armando Compean – bass
Dave Stone – bass
Greg Leisz – pedal steel guitar
Leland Sklar – bass
Simeon Pillich – bass
Alex Acuña – drums
Steve Porcaro – synthesizer
Denny Freeman – piano
Matt Cartsonis – mandolin
Van Dyke Parks – accordion
Lenny Castro – percussion
John Spooner – field drums
Eric Rigler – bagpipe, Uilleann pipes, whistles
Max Carl – background vocals
Blondie Chaplin – vocals, background vocals
Kenny Edwards – background vocals
Arlo Guthrie – vocals, background vocals

References

2001 albums
Jennifer Warnes albums